The Lexington Broadcast Services Company (first known as Lexington Broadcast Services and later known as LBS Communications) was a television production and syndication company formed on November 15, 1976, by advertising pioneer Henry Siegel, who, according to Advertising Age, was "the man who built Lexington Broadcast Services into the nation's largest barter syndicator, and thus defined that segment of the TV ad business."

History
LBS was originally a unit of Grey Advertising, in order to develop products that were marketed for syndication. Some of the first products that were made were Not for Women Only, which was produced by WNBC-TV in New York City, and Hot Fudge, which was produced by then-ABC O&O WXYZ-TV in Detroit. Siegel was moved from Grey Advertising's president in order to become head of Lexington Broadcast Services Company. In 1977, it launched its first breakout hit for the company, Sha Na Na, for syndication, with advertising on a barter basis.

In 1982, it entered into a partnership with Columbia Pictures Television to bring the ABC drama Family to off-net syndication starting in the fall of 1983, with LBS handling distribution under license from Columbia Pictures, which was sold onto a barter basis. The success of Family led to the formation of the Colex Enterprises joint venture (as mentioned below). In 1986, it launched a syndicated block with DIC Entertainment and Mattel, Kideo TV. That year, DIC and LBS formed the Family Theater package of eight animated specials, and decided that DIC and LBS would team up with Columbia Pictures Television to produce a live-action Dennis the Menace feature film.

In 1985, LBS, DIC Enterprises and Karl/Lorimar Home Video set up a home video distribution venture, Kideo Video, which released titles from LBS' Kideo catalog, through which, by 1986, LBS planned to release titles for the videocassette market, and it gained programming rights for 200 Kideo titles.  By 1987, LBS had to market beauty videocassettes due to the underperforming expectations of the initial Kideo videocassettes, and sponsored made-for-TV specials would not be included in its initial deal.

In June 1987, DIC and LBS settled their lawsuits regarding Kideo Video "amicably" out of court, due to the cross complaints that stemmed from the home video label beginning in 1985.  The settlement allowed Lorimar Home Video to continue distributing for the home video market certain kids' animated programs, and called for LBS and DIC to have the right to enter into separate home video agreements independently of each other.  In addition, the rights of one of the companies could be independent of each other, and also independent of Lorimar Home Video, and the issue of a joint account that LBS was managing and allegedly was being trafficked in and out of the Cayman Islands was raised.  It was revealed that there was wrongdoing in the $250 million account co-owned by LBS.

In late July 1987, LBS Communications, on behalf of Westgate Entertainment, began marketing a $3 million, two-hour barter syndicated special on the Titanic, and LBS and Westgate had exclusive rights to the taped footage of the attacks at that time.  The company had to feed the special to an ad-hoc network of TV stations on October 28, and at least 30 minutes of the two-hour special would be from Monte Carlo. It was decided that LBS would sell the telecast as part of a four-special barter package.

The company was known for distributing programs from DIC Entertainment and Columbia Pictures Television (including select material from Columbia subsidiary/label Screen Gems), by way of its Colex Enterprises joint venture with Columbia, in addition to the 1991 syndicated re-launch of Baywatch. The company was also known for handling Elia Kazan's films that he directed from 1945 to 1976, and syndicating selected Bob Hope-produced movies that reverted to him after their initial release. That year, LBS Communications built up its distribution arm to allow stations to broadcast syndicated TV productions from outside production companies, and Paul Siegel would take over as president of the LBS Entertainment division. He had plans for advertising with Paramount Domestic Television and Coca-Cola Telecommunications, but the company then found itself in the cold, and the alternatives failed to materialize due to a management buyout of the company from Grey Advertising by Marvin Davis, who was a former employee of the 20th Century-Fox film studio.

Around the time that the joint venture with Columbia Pictures Entertainment ended in 1988, LBS began to lose money, and in December 1991, LBS filed for Chapter 11 bankruptcy. As a result, the company ended up having to sell between 80 and 85 percent of its assets to its Baywatch distributor partner, the Scotti Brothers' All American Television. In 1997, All American was sold to Pearson plc, and was re-branded as Pearson Television. Pearson Television later merged with CLT-UFA to form RTL Group and Pearson Television was renamed Fremantle. As of today, some of LBS' library is owned by Fremantle, while many of their programs are owned by other companies.

Programming distributed by LBS

TV programs

Ad sales
 Fame
 Hollywood Squares (1986–89)
 The New Liar's Club
 This Is Your Life (1983–84)
 Too Close for Comfort

Colex Enterprises
 The Canterville Ghost (1986)
 Dennis the Menace
 The Donna Reed Show
 Eischeid
 Family Reunion
 Father Knows Best
 The Flying Nun
 The George Burns and Gracie Allen Show
 Ghost Story
 Gidget
 Gidget's Summer Reunion (1985)
 Hawk
 Hazel
 Joe Forrester
 Jungle Jim
 Miracle of the Heart: A Boys Town Story (1986)
 The Monkees
 Route 66
 Wild Bill Hickok

Films 
 Heathcliff: The Movie (1986) (released by Atlantic Entertainment Group and produced by DIC Entertainment and McNaught Syndicate)
 Care Bears Movie II: A New Generation (1986) (released by Columbia Pictures and produced by Nelvana)

TV specials

References 

RTL Group
Former Bertelsmann subsidiaries
1976 establishments in New York City
1992 disestablishments in New York (state)
Companies based in New York City
Mass media companies established in 1976
Defunct mass media companies of the United States
Television syndication distributors
Mass media companies disestablished in 1992